Lovesong is a 2009 novel by the Australian author Alex Miller.

Awards and nominations
Winner, 2011, New South Wales Premier's Literary Awards, Christina Stead Prize for Fiction
Winner, 2011 NSW Premier's Literary Awards, People's Choice Award
Winner, 2010 Age Book of the Year
Winner, 2010 Age Book of the Year (Fiction)
Shortlisted, 2010 Prime Minister's Literary Awards - Fiction
Shortlisted, Miles Franklin Literary Award 2010
WC Shortlisted, 2010 Queensland Premier's Literary Awards (Fiction)
Shortlisted, 2009 Colin Roderick Award
Longlisted, 2011 International IMPAC DUBLIN Literary Award

Reviews
 Reading Matters, accessed 1 July 2013
 Review by Geordie Williamson, 2009, The Monthly, accessed 1 July 2013
Judith Armstrong, 2009, 'Miller's Crossings', Australian Book Review, accessed 1 July 2013.

References
Alex Miller, AustLit, http://www.austlit.edu.au/austlit/page/A12971 Accessed June 2013

2009 Australian novels
Allen & Unwin books
Novels by Alex Miller